The 2020 Los Angeles Guerrillas season was the first season of the Los Angeles Guerrillas' existence in the Call of Duty League. Los Angeles Guerrillas would finish the regular season in twelfth place with a 5 – 17 record, this placed them in losers round 1 of the playoffs.

Preceding offseason 
On August 20, 2019, Activision Blizzard announced that Kroenke Sports & Entertainment had purchased one of the two new franchise slots for the Call of Duty League. On October 18, 2019, branding was revealed as the Los Angeles Guerrillas.

Final roster

Transactions 
Transactions of/for players on the roster during the 2020 regular season:
On February 28, 2020, Guerrillas signed Spart and Vivid.
On July 22, 2020, Aches left the team.

Standings

Game log

Regular season

Playoffs

References

External links
 

Los Angeles Guerrillas
Los Angeles Guerrillas seasons